Triatoma dimidiata is a blood-sucking insect whose range extends from northern South America (Colombia, Venezuela, Ecuador, and Peru), throughout all the countries of Central America and into Southern Mexico. It is among the most important carriers of Trypanosoma cruzi, the flagellate protozoa that causes Chagas disease.  Dimidiata has been found in rock piles, caves occupied by bats, hollow trees occupied by mammals or birds, and other diverse ecotopes. However, their presence in human abodes is usually happenstance; people tend to bring them indoors with their firewood.  When in the nymph form they may camouflage themselves from predators by scraping dust over their dorsal abdomen, a behavior also observed in T. phyllosoma, T. nigromaculata, Panstrongylus geniculatus, P. megistus and P. herreri nymphs. Moreover, due to geological past in  Mesoamerica such as forest loss, and rising temperatures, there has been an  increase in  Triatomine bugs infestation.

References 

 Zeledón R (1981) El Triatoma dimidiata (Latreille, 1811) y su relación con la enfermedad de Chagas. Editorial Universidad Estatal a Distancia. Costa Rica

Reduviidae
Insect vectors of human pathogens
Chagas disease
Invertebrates of Venezuela
Insects described in 1811
Hemiptera of South America